Cathedral is a census-designated place (CDP) located in and governed by Hinsdale County, Colorado, United States. The population of the Cathedral CDP was 14 at the United States Census 2010. The Powderhorn post office (Zip Code 81243) serves the area.

Geography
Cathedral is located in the northeast corner of Hinsdale County on the east side of Cebolla Creek, a north-flowing tributary of the Gunnison River. The community is at the junction of County Roads 50 and 45. County Road 50 also leads north (downstream) from Cathedral into Gunnison and eventually via County Road 27  to Highway 149 at Powderhorn.

Demographics

See also

List of census-designated places in Colorado

References

External links

 Cathedral @ UncoverColorado.com
 Hinsdale County website

Census-designated places in Hinsdale County, Colorado
Census-designated places in Colorado